Kondapalli Reserve Forest is a reserved forest in the Krishna district of the Indian state of Andhra Pradesh.

Fauna

The forest is home to several carnivorous animals like, leopards, wild dogs and a few others like, jackals, wolves, civet cats as well. The herbivorous animals in the forest include, wild boars, sambar deer, chital, barking deer, rhesus monkey and four-horned antelopes. Birds such as peacocks.

Flora

Tella poniki softwood is found in the forest which is useful in making the Kondapalli Toys.

References

Reserved forests of India
Krishna district
Protected areas of Andhra Pradesh
Protected areas with year of establishment missing